The common basilisk (Basiliscus basiliscus) is a species of lizard in the family Corytophanidae. The species is endemic to Central America and South America, where it is found near rivers and streams in rainforests.

Description
The common basilisk can be distinguished from similar species within its range by its large size and the high fin-like crest along its back. Most common basilisks are brown and cream in color. Males also have high crests on the head and tail. Both sexes are brown to olive, and have a white, cream, or yellow stripe on the upper lip and a second stripe along either side of the body; these stripes have higher contrast in juveniles and fade as the lizards age.

Adults can grow to a total length (including tail) of 76 cm (2.5 feet). Females are generally , and weigh half as much as males. The tail comprises 70 to 75% of the total length: for example, a 70-cm-long (27.5-inch-long) common basilisk would have a 50-cm-long (19.5-inch-long) tail. The common basilisk has a large mouth with saw-like teeth on the inner sides of the jaw. While the common basilisk is most known for its ability to run on water, it is also an excellent climber and swimmer, and has been known to stay underwater for up to half an hour. The average lifespan is seven years in captivity; in the wild, it tends to be less because of predators.

When startled, the common basilisk escapes by speeding to the nearest edge of water—and continues sprinting. The lizard runs on only its hind legs in an erect position, holding its forelegs to its sides. The common basilisk is adroit on water because its feet are large and equipped with flaps of skin along the toes that allow it to catch on tiny air bubbles. When moving quickly, the lizard can cross a surface of water before sinking. On water, it runs an average speed of 24.1 km/h (or 15 mph), which is just a little slower than its speed on land. Younger basilisks can run  on water, while adults cross only a few meters before sinking. Adults do not move slowly, but they weigh more and cannot sprint for as long a time. Once a basilisk submerges, it continues swimming until it is sufficiently far from its pursuer — if the predator has followed past the bank. Although the common basilisk stays close to water to escape terrestrial predators, it swims only when necessary because some other aquatic animals would eat it given the chance.

Geographic range and habitat
The species ranges from southwestern Nicaragua to northwestern Colombia on the Pacific side, and from central Panama to northwestern Venezuela on the Atlantic side. In Costa Rica, it is mostly found on the Pacific side of the country. The equivalent species on the Atlantic side is the green basilisk (Basiliscus plumifrons), which occupies similar habitats and has similar biology. also recently being found in South Florida.

Diet
B. basiliscus is an omnivore; its diet consists of insects, for example, beetles or dragon flies; flowers, and small vertebrates such as snakes, birds, eggs, and fish.

Predators
The common basilisk has many natural predators; large reptiles, birds, and some mammals. To avoid predators, it can conceal itself under leaves on the forest floor and can remain motionless for a long time. When the common basilisk must flee, though, its skill of running on water can help it avoid many predators, and when the common basilisk can no longer run on the water, it will use its strong swimming capabilities to continue underwater.

Reproduction
Females of B. basiliscus lay three to four clutches of 10–20 eggs a year. Eggs hatch after about three months and the young weigh about two grams and are up to three inches long. Their outstanding camouflage allows them to remain undetected when they remain still.

Walking on water

The common basilisk, along with the other members of its genus, take the nickname the "Jesus Christ lizard" or "Jesus lizard" because when fleeing from predators, they gather sufficient momentum to run across the water for a brief distance while holding most of their body out of the water (similar to the biblical story of Jesus walking on water). Basilisks have large hind feet with scaly fringes on the sides of the third, fourth, and fifth toes. These are compressed against the toes when this lizard walks on land; but if it senses danger, it can jump into the water, opening up these fringes against the water's surface. This increases the surface area of the foot, thus allowing it to run on the water for short distances. This occurs in three steps. First is the slap, the downward movement of the foot that pushes water out and away from the leg. This also created pockets of air around the foot. Next is the stroke, the backwards movement of the foot, which propels it forward. Next is the recovery, when the foot comes up and out of the water and prepares to do the slap again. Smaller basilisks can run about 10–20 m without sinking. Juveniles can usually run farther than older basilisks, while holding more of their body above the water.

Taxonomy and etymology
The common basilisk is named for the creature of Greek mythology made up of parts of a rooster, snake, and lion which could turn a man to stone by its gaze: the basilisk.  Its generic, specific, and common names all derive from the Greek basilískos (βασιλίσκος) meaning "little king". The specific epithet was given in Carl Linnaeus' 10th edition of Systema Naturae.

References

Further reading
Boulenger GA (1885). Catalogue of the Lizards in the British Museum (Natural History). Second Edition. Volume II. Iguanidæ ... London: Trustees of the British Museum (Natural History). (Taylor and Francis, printers). xiii + 497 pp. + Plates I-XXIV. (Basiliscus americanus, p. 108).
Lang, Mathias (1989). "Phylogenetic and Geographic Patterns of Basiliscine Iguanians (Reptilia: Squamata: “Iguanidae”)". Bonner Zoologische Monographien (28): 1-172. (Basiliscus basiliscus, pp. 125–129).
Linnaeus C (1758). Systema naturæ per regna tria naturæ, secundum classes, ordines, genera, species, cum characteribus, differentiis, synonymis, locis. Tomus I. Editio Decima, Reformata. Stockholm: L. Salvius. 824 pp. (Lacerta basiliscus, new species, p. 206). (in Latin).

External links
National Geographic: Video of basilisk lizard running on water
National Geographic: Green Basilisk Lizard
National Geographic: How 'Jesus Lizards' Walk on Water

Basiliscus
Lizards of Central America
Lizards of South America
Reptiles of Colombia
Reptiles of Costa Rica
Reptiles of Guatemala
Reptiles of Nicaragua
Reptiles of Panama
Articles containing video clips
Reptiles described in 1758
Taxa named by Carl Linnaeus